Thesteia (Θεστεῖα) or Thestia (Θεστῖα) was a town in ancient Aetolia. The name occurs only in Polybius, from whose narrative we learn that it was situated in the northern part of the upper plain of Aetolia. The name is perhaps connected with Thestius, one of the old Aetolian heroes.

Its site is located near the modern Ano Vlokhos.

References

Populated places in ancient Aetolia
Former populated places in Greece